Website Meta Language (WML) and its associated command wmk are together a free and extensible web designer's off-line HTML generation toolkit for Unix, distributed under the GNU General Public License (GPL v2). It works as an off-line content management system (aka a static site generator). It is written in ANSI C and Perl 5, built via a CMake based source tree and runs out-of-the-box on all major Unix derivates.

WML consists of a control frontend driving up to nine backends in a sequential pass-oriented filtering scheme. Each backend provides one particular core language. WML additionally ships with a set of include files which provide some higher-level features.

WML's nine backends are:

 Pass 1: Source Reading and Include File Expansion (ipp)
 Pass 2: HTML Macro Construct Expansion (mp4h)
 Pass 3: Perl 5 Programming Construct Expansion
 Pass 4: M4 Macro Construct Expansion (gm4)
 Pass 5: Diversion Filter (divert)
 Pass 6: Character and String Substitution (asubst)
 Pass 7: HTML Fixup (htmlfix)
 Pass 8: Line Stripping and Output Fixup (htmlstrip)
 Pass 9: Output Splitting and Final Writing (slice)

See also
Website template
Haml

References

External links

GitHub Repository
GPL Builder Homepage

Free software programmed in C
Free software programmed in Perl
Free web development software
Perl software
 
Information systems
Website management